Arevashogh (also Romanized as Arevashokh; formerly, Chikdamal and Chigdamal) is a town in the Lori Province of Armenia.

References 

World Gazeteer: Armenia – World-Gazetteer.com

Populated places in Lori Province